Operation Cyclone was the code name for the United States Central Intelligence Agency (CIA) program to arm and finance the Afghan mujahideen in Afghanistan from 1979 to 1992, prior to and during the military intervention by the USSR in support of the Democratic Republic of Afghanistan. The mujahideen were also supported by Britain's MI6, who conducted their own separate covert actions. The program leaned heavily towards supporting militant Islamic groups, including groups with jihadist ties, that were favored by the regime of Muhammad Zia-ul-Haq in neighboring Pakistan, rather than other, less ideological Afghan resistance groups that had also been fighting the Soviet-oriented Democratic Republic of Afghanistan administration since before the Soviet intervention.

Operation Cyclone was one of the longest and most expensive covert CIA operations ever undertaken. Funding officially began with $695,000 in mid-1979, was increased dramatically to $20–$30 million per year in 1980, and rose to $630 million per year in 1987, described as the "biggest bequest to any Third World insurgency". The first CIA-supplied weapons were antique British Lee–Enfield rifles shipped out in December 1979; by September 1986 the program included U.S.-origin state of the art weaponry, such as FIM-92 Stinger surface-to-air missiles, some 2,300 of which were ultimately shipped into Afghanistan. Funding continued (albeit reduced) after the 1989 Soviet withdrawal, as the mujahideen continued to battle the forces of President Mohammad Najibullah's army during the Afghan Civil War (1989–1992).

Background
Under the leadership of Nur Muhammad Taraki, communists seized power in Afghanistan on 27 April 1978. The newly-formed Democratic Republic of Afghanistan (DRA)—which was divided between Taraki's extremist Khalq faction and the more moderate Parcham—signed a treaty of friendship with the Soviet Union in December of that year. Taraki's efforts to improve secular education and redistribute land were accompanied by mass executions (including many conservative religious leaders) and political oppression unprecedented in Afghan history, igniting a revolt by Afghan mujahideen rebels.

Following a general uprising in April 1979, Taraki was deposed by Khalq rival Hafizullah Amin in September. Amin was considered a "brutal psychopath" by foreign observers; the Soviets were particularly alarmed by the brutality of the late Khalq regime, and suspected Amin of being an agent of the U.S. Central Intelligence Agency (CIA), although that was not the case.

In the late 1970s, Pakistani intelligence officials began privately lobbying the U.S. and its allies to send material assistance to the Islamist insurgents. Pakistani President Muhammad Zia-ul-Haq's ties with the U.S. had been strained during Jimmy Carter's presidency due to Pakistan's nuclear program and the execution of Zulfikar Ali Bhutto in April 1979, but Carter told National Security Adviser Zbigniew Brzezinski and Secretary of State Cyrus Vance as early as January 1979 that it was vital to "repair our relationships with Pakistan" in light of the unrest in Iran. According to former CIA official Robert Gates, "the Carter administration turned to CIA ... to counter Soviet and Cuban aggression in the Third World, particularly beginning in mid-1979." In March 1979, "CIA sent several covert action options relating to Afghanistan to the SCC [Special Coordination Committee]" of the United States National Security Council. At a 30 March meeting, U.S. Department of Defense representative Walter B. Slocombe "asked if there was value in keeping the Afghan insurgency going, 'sucking the Soviets into a Vietnamese quagmire?'" When asked to clarify this remark, Slocombe explained: "Well, the whole idea was that if the Soviets decided to strike at this tar baby [Afghanistan] we had every interest in making sure that they got stuck." But a 5 April memo from National Intelligence Officer Arnold Horelick warned: "Covert action would raise the costs to the Soviets and inflame Moslem opinion against them in many countries. The risk was that a substantial U.S. covert aid program could raise the stakes and induce the Soviets to intervene more directly and vigorously than otherwise intended."

In May 1979, U.S. officials secretly began meeting with rebel leaders through Pakistani government contacts. A former Pakistani military official claimed that he personally introduced a CIA official to Gulbuddin Hekmatyar that month (Freedom of Information Act requests for records describing these meetings have been denied). Additional meetings were held on 6 April and 3 July, and on the same day as the second meeting, Carter signed two presidential findings permitting the CIA to spend $695,000 on non-military assistance (e.g., "cash, medical equipment, and radio transmitters") and on a propaganda campaign targeting the Soviet-backed leadership of the DRA, which (in the words of Steve Coll) "seemed at the time a small beginning." By December 1979, Amin's government had lost control of much of Afghanistan, prompting the Soviet Union to invade the country, execute Amin, and install Parcham leader Babrak Karmal as president.

The full significance of the U.S. sending aid to the mujahideen prior to the invasion is debated among scholars. Some assert that it directly, and even deliberately, provoked the Soviets to send in troops. Bruce Riedel, however, believes that the U.S. aid was intended primarily to improve U.S. relations with Pakistan, while Coll asserts: "Contemporary memos—particularly those written in the first days after the Soviet invasion—make clear that while Brzezinski was determined to confront the Soviets in Afghanistan through covert action, he was also very worried the Soviets would prevail. ... Given this evidence and the enormous political and security costs that the invasion imposed on the Carter administration, any claim that Brzezinski lured the Soviets into Afghanistan warrants deep skepticism." A 2020 review of declassified U.S. documents by Conor Tobin in the journal Diplomatic History found that "a Soviet military intervention was neither sought nor desired by the Carter administration ... The small-scale covert program that developed in response to the increasing Soviet influence was part of a contingency plan if the Soviets did intervene militarily, as Washington would be in a better position to make it difficult for them to consolidate their position, but not designed to induce an intervention."

Carter expressed surprise at the December 1979 invasion. According to Riedel, the consensus of the U.S. intelligence community during 1978 and 1979—reiterated as late as 29 September 1979—was that "Moscow would not intervene in force even if it appeared likely that the Khalq government was about to collapse." Indeed, Carter's diary entries from November 1979 until the Soviet invasion in late December contain only two short references to Afghanistan, and are instead preoccupied with the ongoing hostage crisis in Iran. In the West, the Soviet invasion of Afghanistan was considered a threat to global security and the oil supplies of the Persian Gulf. Moreover, the failure to accurately predict Soviet intentions caused American officials to reappraise the Soviet threat to both Iran and Pakistan, although it is now known that those fears were overblown. For example, U.S. intelligence closely followed Soviet exercises for an invasion of Iran throughout 1980, while an earlier warning from Brzezinski that "if the Soviets came to dominate Afghanistan, they could promote a separate Baluchistan ... [thus] dismembering Pakistan and Iran" took on new urgency.

In the aftermath of the invasion, Carter was determined to respond vigorously. In a televised speech, he announced sanctions on the Soviet Union, promised renewed aid to Pakistan, and committed the U.S. to the Persian Gulf's defense. Carter also called for a boycott of the 1980 Summer Olympics in Moscow, which raised a bitter controversy. British prime minister Margaret Thatcher enthusiastically backed Carter's tough stance, although British intelligence believed "the CIA was being too alarmist about the Soviet threat to Pakistan."

Although Director of Central Intelligence (DCI) Stansfield Turner and the CIA's Directorate of Operations (DO) were contemplating what Gates described as "several enhancement options"—up to and including the direct provision of arms from the U.S. to the mujahideen through the ISI—by October 1979, and an unnamed Brzezinski aide acknowledged in conversation with Selig S. Harrison that the U.S.'s nominally "non-lethal" assistance to the mujahideen included facilitating arms shipments by third-parties, Coll, Harrison, Riedel, and the head of the DO's Near East–South Asia Division at the time—Charles Cogan—all state that no U.S.-supplied arms intended for the mujahideen reached Pakistan until January 1980, after Carter amended his presidential finding to include lethal provisions in late December 1979. This is also corroborated by Tobin: "With the 'evidence of movement' of Soviet military forces detected near Afghanistan's borders, the SCC resolved on December 17 to 'explore with the Pakistanis and British the possibility of improving the financing, arming and communications of rebel forces to make it as expensive as possible for the Soviets to continue their efforts.' This likely meant increased financing of arms purchases rather than direct arms support, but the initiatives were not undertaken until after the invasion began, and no weapons were directly supplied before January 1980."

The thrust of U.S. policy for the duration of the war was determined by Carter in early 1980: Carter initiated a program to arm the mujahideen through Pakistan's ISI and secured a pledge from Saudi Arabia to match U.S. funding for this purpose. U.S. support for the mujahideen accelerated under Carter's successor, Ronald Reagan, at a final cost to U.S. taxpayers of some $3 billion. The decision to route U.S. aid through Pakistan led to massive fraud, as weapons sent to Karachi were frequently sold on the local market rather than delivered to the Afghan rebels; Karachi soon "became one of the most violent cities in the world." Pakistan also controlled which rebels received assistance: Of the seven mujahideen groups supported by Zia's government, four espoused Islamic fundamentalist beliefs—and these fundamentalists received most of the funding. Despite this, Carter has expressed no regrets over his decision to support what he still considers the "freedom fighters" in Afghanistan.

Program

Key proponents of the initial program were Texas Congressman Charlie Wilson; Michael G. Vickers, a young CIA paramilitary officer; and Gust Avrakotos, the CIA's regional head, who developed a close relationship with Wilson. Their strategy was to provide a broad mix of weapons, tactics, and logistics, along with training programs, to enhance the rebels' ability to fight a guerilla war against the Soviets. Initially, to avoid detection of U.S. involvement, the program supplied the rebels only with Soviet-made weaponry. This plan was enabled by the tacit support of Israel, which had captured large stockpiles of Soviet-made weaponry during the Yom Kippur War and agreed to sell them to the CIA clandestinely, as well as Egypt, which had recently modernized its army with weapons purchased from Western nations, funneling the older Soviet-made arms to the mujahideen. After 1985, as the Reagan administration announced that it would support anti-Soviet resistance movements globally (in what is now known as the Reagan Doctrine), there was no longer a need to obfuscate the origin of the weaponry; Pentagon senior official, Michael Pillsbury, successfully advocated providing U.S.-made weaponry, including large numbers of Stinger missiles, to the Afghan resistance.

The distribution of the weaponry relied heavily on the Pakistani President Muhammad Zia-ul-Haq, who had a personal relationship with Congressman Wilson. His Inter-Services Intelligence (ISI) was an intermediary for funds distribution, passing of weapons, military training and financial support to Afghan resistance groups. Along with funding from Saudi Arabia and the People's Republic of China, the ISI developed a complex infrastructure that was directly training 16,000 to 18,000 mujahideen fighters annually by early 1986 (and indirectly facilitating training for thousands of others by Afghans that had previously been recipients of ISI instruction). They encouraged the volunteers from the Arab states to join the Afghan resistance in its struggle against the Soviet troops based in Afghanistan.

Reports show civilian personnel from the U.S. Department of State and the CIA frequently visited the Afghanistan-Pakistan border area during this time, and the US contributed generously to aiding Afghan refugees. CIA director William Casey secretly visited Pakistan numerous times to meet with the ISI officers managing the mujahideen, and personally observed the guerrillas training on at least one occasion. Coll reports that

Casey startled his Pakistani hosts by proposing that they take the Afghan war into enemy territory—into the Soviet Union itself. Casey wanted to ship subversive propaganda through Afghanistan to the Soviet Union's predominantly Muslim southern republics. The Pakistanis agreed, and the CIA soon supplied thousands of Korans, as well as books on Soviet atrocities in Uzbekistan and tracts on historical heroes of Uzbek nationalism, according to Pakistani and Western officials.

Other direct points of contact between the US government and mujahideen include the CIA flying Hekmatyar to the United States, where he was hosted by State Department official Zalmay Khalizad. Hekmatyar was invited to meet with President Reagan but refused, and was replaced at the White House's October 1985 conference with mujahideen by Younis Khalis, who publicly invited Reagan to convert to Islam. CIA Islamabad station chief Howard Hart developed a personal relationship with Abdul Haq, which was continued by Hart's successor, William Piekney, and led to the Afghan meeting both Reagan and Margaret Thatcher. Assistant Secretary of Defense Richard Armitage regularly met with mujahideen, particularly Burhanuddin Rabbani. CIA agents are also known to have given direct cash payments to Jalaluddin Haqqani.

The U.S.-built Stinger antiaircraft missile, was supplied to the mujahideen in very large numbers beginning in 1986. The weapon struck a decisive blow to the Soviet war effort as it allowed the lightly armed Afghans to effectively defend against Soviet helicopter landings in strategic areas. The Stingers were so renowned and deadly that, in the 1990s, the U.S. conducted a "buy-back" program to keep unused missiles from falling into the hands of anti-American terrorists. This program may have been covertly renewed following the U.S. intervention in Afghanistan in late 2001, out of fear that remaining Stingers could be used against U.S. forces in the country.

Reagan's program assisted in ending the Soviet occupation in Afghanistan, with the Soviets unable to quell the insurgency. On 20 July 1987, the withdrawal of Soviet troops from the country was announced pursuant to the negotiations that led to the Geneva Accords of 1988, with the last Soviets leaving on 15 February 1989. Soviet forces suffered over 14,000 killed and missing, and over 50,000 wounded. The withdrawal helped precipitate the dissolution of the Soviet Union itself.

Funding

The U.S. offered two packages of economic assistance and military sales to support Pakistan's role in the war against the Soviet troops in Afghanistan. The first six-year assistance package (1981–87) amounted to US$3.2 billion, equally divided between economic assistance and military sales. The U.S. also sold 40 F-16 aircraft to Pakistan during 1983–87 at a cost of $1.2 billion outside the assistance package. The second six-year assistance package (1987–93) amounted to $4.2 billion. Out of this, $2.28 billion were allocated for economic assistance in the form of grants or loan that carried the interest rate of 2–3 per cent. The rest of the allocation ($1.74 billion) was in the form of credit for military purchases. In total, the combined U.S., Saudi, and Chinese aid to the mujahideen is valued at between $6–12 billion.

The mujahideen benefited from expanded foreign military support from the United States, Saudi Arabia, Pakistan, United Kingdom and other Muslim nations. Saudi Arabia in particular agreed to match dollar for dollar the money the CIA was sending to the Mujahideen. When Saudi payments were late, Wilson and Avrakotos would fly to Saudi Arabia to persuade the monarchy to fulfill its commitments.

Levels of support to the various Afghan factions varied. The ISI tended to favor vigorous Islamists like Hekmatyar's Hezb-e Islami Gulbuddin and Haqqani. Some Americans agreed. However, others favored the relative moderates like Ahmed Shah Massoud. These included two Heritage Foundation foreign policy analysts, Michael Johns and James A. Phillips, both of whom championed Massoud as the Afghan resistance leader most worthy of US support under the Reagan Doctrine.

Britain's support

Britain's MI6 supported one of the hardline Islamic groups commanded by Ahmad Shah Massoud, who they saw as an effective fighter. Despite the CIA's doubts about Massoud, he became a key MI6 ally; MI6 sent an annual mission of two of their officers as well as military instructors to Massoud and his fighters. Of the weapons given covertly - most were old British army Lee Enfields, some of which were purchased from Indian Army stocks, which proved popular amongst the Afghan resistance groups. Limpet mines, explosives, radios, intelligence, and around fifty Blowpipe Missile launchers with 300 Missiles were sent to the Afghan resistance. The Special Air Service meanwhile gave the resistance vital training inside and outside of Afghanistan.

Aftermath
After the withdrawal of Soviet troops, the U.S. shifted its interest from Afghanistan. American funding of Hekmatyar and his Hezb-i-Islami party was cut off immediately.

In October 1990, U.S. President George H. W. Bush refused to certify that Pakistan did not possess a nuclear explosive device, triggering the imposition of sanctions against Pakistan under the Pressler Amendment (1985) to the Foreign Assistance Act (1961). This disrupted the second assistance package offered in 1987 and discontinued economic assistance and military sales to Pakistan with the exception of the economic assistance already on its way to Pakistan. Military sales and training programs were abandoned as well and some of the Pakistani military officers under training in the U.S. were asked to return home.

As late as 1991 Charlie Wilson persuaded the House Intelligence Committee to continue the funding of the Mujahideen, providing them with $200 million for fiscal year 1992. With the matching funds from Saudi Arabia, this amounted to $400 million for that year. Afghan tribes were also delivered weapons which the United States captured from Iraq during the Gulf War.

In a 1998 interview with news magazine Le Nouvel Observateur, Brzezninski was asked whether he regretted the operation having given arms and advice to future terrorists. Brzezinski was quoted as saying: "What is more important in world history? The Taliban or the collapse of the Soviet empire? Some agitated Moslems or the liberation of Central Europe and the end of the cold war?" In the context of disputed statements attributed to Brzezinski concerning the United States setting a “trap” for the Soviet Union, Tobin cautions that "there are, however, significant problems with [the Le Nouvel Observateur interview] as an historical source. ... the published remarks were heavily edited and Brzezinski has denied the article's accuracy on numerous occasions, asserting that it was 'not an interview, but excerpts from an interview that was originally supposed to be published in full but which they never checked with me for approval in the form that it did appear.' It is also likely a casualty of translation—being conducted in English, translated and printed in French, and reconverted to English—with the original statements becoming skewed and distorted in their edited and translated form."

Criticism

The U.S. government has been criticized for allowing Pakistan to channel a disproportionate amount of its funding to the controversial Hekmatyar, whom Pakistani officials believed was "their man". Hekmatyar has been criticized for killing other mujahideen and attacking civilian populations, including shelling Kabul with American-supplied weapons, causing 2,000 casualties. Hekmatyar was said to be friendly with Osama bin Laden, founder of al-Qaeda, who was running an operation for assisting "Afghan Arab" volunteers fighting in Afghanistan, called Maktab al-Khadamat. Alarmed by his behavior, Pakistan leader General Zia warned Hekmatyar, "It was Pakistan that made him an Afghan leader and it is Pakistan who can equally destroy him if he continues to misbehave."
The CIA and State Department have been criticized for publishing textbooks intended to indoctrinate children with racism and hatred towards foreigners and towards non-muslim Afghans.
The CIA and State Department have also been criticized for their direct relationship with Hekmatyar, beyond ISI contact, in spite of his being one of the leading heroin smugglers in the region.

In the late 1980s, Pakistani prime minister Benazir Bhutto, concerned about the growing strength of the Islamist movement, told President George H. W. Bush, "You are creating a Frankenstein."

Others have asserted funding the mujahideen may have played a role in causing the September 11 attacks. A number of political commentators have described Al-Qaeda attacks as "blowback" or an unintended consequence of American aid to the mujahideen.

The lion's share of funding given to mujahideen commander Gulbuddin Hekmatyar was also criticized, with one U.S. expert of the mujahideen telling the Washington Post:

Allegations of CIA assistance to bin Laden

Some have alleged that bin Laden and al Qaeda were beneficiaries of CIA assistance. This is challenged by experts such as Coll—who notes that declassified CIA records and interviews with CIA officers do not support such claims—and Peter Bergen, who argues: "It's worth mentioning here that there is simply no evidence for the common myth that bin Laden and his Afghan Arabs were supported by the CIA financially. Nor is there any evidence that CIA officials at any level met with bin Laden or anyone in his circle." Bergen insists that U.S. funding went to the Afghan mujahideen, not the Arab volunteers who arrived to assist them.

However, Sir Martin Ewans noted that the Afghan Arabs "benefited indirectly from the CIA's funding, through the ISI and resistance organizations," and that "it has been reckoned that as many as 35,000 'Arab-Afghans' may have received military training in Pakistan at an estimated cost of $800 million in the years up to and including 1988." Some of the CIA's greatest Afghan beneficiaries were Arabist commanders such as Haqqani and Hekmatyar who were key allies of bin Laden over many years. Haqqani—one of bin Laden's closest associates in the 1980s—received direct cash payments from CIA agents, without the mediation of the ISI. This independent source of funding gave Haqqani disproportionate influence over the mujahideen. Haqqani and his network played an important role in the formation and growth of al Qaeda, with Haqqani allowing bin Laden to train mujahideen volunteers in Haqqani territory and build extensive infrastructure there. Milton Bearden, the CIA's Islamabad station chief from mid-1986 until mid-1989, took an admiring view of bin Laden at the time.

See also
 Ahmad Shah Massoud
 Allegations of CIA assistance to Osama bin Laden
 Afghan Civil War
 Afghan training camp
 Badaber Uprising
 Charlie Wilson's War: The Extraordinary Story of the Largest Covert Operation in History
 Charlie Wilson's War
 CIA activities in Afghanistan
 Gary Schroen
 Howard Hart
 Jalaluddin Haqqani
 Joanne Herring
 Timber Sycamore
 United States involvement in regime change
 United States and state-sponsored terrorism

References

Central Intelligence Agency operations
CIA and Islamism
Afghanistan–United States relations
Al-Qaeda
Anti-communism in the United States
Cold War conflicts
Guerrilla wars
Inter-Services Intelligence operations
Invasions
Military history of Afghanistan
Cyclone
Pakistan–Soviet Union relations
Islamic Unity of Afghanistan Mujahideen
Soviet Union–United States relations
Wars involving Afghanistan
Wars involving the Soviet Union